Amoureux de Paname is the title by which the unnamed debut album from French singer-songwriter Renaud is commonly known. It was released in 1975 by Polydor Records, and while not a commercial success, anti-bourgeoisie songs like "Hexagone" caused considerable public interest and provided Renaud a springboard to his future success.

Track listing
All songs were written by Renaud Séchan except where noted.

Side one
"Amoureux de Paname" – 2:32
"Société, tu m'auras pas!" – 2:30
"Petite fille des sombres rues" – 2:30
"La Java sans joie" – 3:49
"Gueule d'aminche" – 4:19
"La Coupole" – 1:45

Side two
"Hexagone" – 5:30
"Écoutez-moi les gavroches" (Renaud Séchan, Jacqueline Néro, François Bernheim) – 3:28
"Rita (Chanson d'amour)" – 0:36
"Camarade bourgeois" – 2:23
"Le Gringalet" – 2:21
"La Menthe à l'eau" – 2:42
"Greta" – 2:03

Tracks 2 and 7 were included on the compilation The Meilleur of Renaud (75–85). Track 7 was also included on the CD Ma Compil. Track 7 was covered for the tribute album La Bande à Renaud.

Personnel
 Renaud - vocals
 François Bernheim - musical direction
 Jacqueline Herrenschmidt – musical direction
Scarabee Blanc - arrangements, recording
Technical
Claude Malet - photography

References

1975 debut albums
Renaud albums
Polydor Records albums